Myriangiales is an order of sac fungi, consisting of mostly plant pathogens.

References

 
Ascomycota orders